Martin B. Einhorn (14 August 1942) is an American theoretical physicist.

Education and career
Einhorn received in 1965 his B.S. with honors from Caltech and in 1968 his Ph.D. from Princeton University under Marvin Leonard Goldberger. After postdoctoral positions at Stanford Linear Accelerator Center (SLAC) and at the Lawrence Berkeley Laboratory (LBL), he became a staff physicist at the Fermi National Accelerator Laboratory (Fermilab). In 1976, he joined the faculty of the physics department of the University of Michigan where he was eventually promoted to full professor and retired as professor emeritus in 2004.

In the 1990s he was on the Sakurai Prize selection committee.

Einhorn is an emeritus research professor of UCSB's Kavli Institute for Theoretical Physics and was the Institute's Deputy Director from 1990 to 1992 and from 2004 to 2013.

Honors and awards
 1978 — Department of Energy's Outstanding Junior Investigator Award
 1991 — elected a Fellow of the American Physical Society
 2003 — Guggenheim Fellowship

Selected publications

References

External links

1942 births
Living people
California Institute of Technology alumni
Princeton University alumni
University of Michigan faculty
University of California, Santa Barbara faculty
21st-century American physicists
Particle physicists
Theoretical physicists
Fellows of the American Physical Society